Dmytro Yeremenko (born 20 June 1990) is a Ukrainian football midfielder who plays for Viktoriya Mykolaivka.

Honours
Viktoriya Mykolaivka
 Ukrainian Football Amateur League: 2019–20

Ukraine U19
 UEFA European Under-19 Championship: 2009

External links
 
 

1990 births
Living people
Footballers from Kharkiv
Ukrainian footballers
Association football midfielders
Ukraine under-21 international footballers
Ukraine youth international footballers
Ukrainian expatriate footballers
Expatriate footballers in the Czech Republic
Expatriate footballers in Belarus
Ukrainian expatriate sportspeople in the Czech Republic
Ukrainian expatriate sportspeople in Belarus
Czech First League players
Ukrainian Premier League players
FC Dynamo Kyiv players
FC Dynamo-2 Kyiv players
FC Volyn Lutsk players
FC Metalurh Zaporizhzhia players
FC Metalist Kharkiv players
Bohemians 1905 players
FC Vorskla Poltava players
FC Olimpik Donetsk players
FC Slutsk players
FC Hoverla Uzhhorod players
FC Obolon-Brovar Kyiv players
FC Viktoriya Mykolaivka players
FC Nyva Buzova players